Albanvale is a suburb in Melbourne, Victoria, Australia,  north-west of Melbourne's Central Business District, located within the City of Brimbank local government area.

The border of Albanvale consists of Station Road, Main Road West, Kororoit Creek, Fairfax Circuit, Concord Circuit and Brimbank Central Shopping Centre. The 2009 edition of the Melway Street Directory clearly marks the shopping centre in Deer Park. The suburb was established in the 1970s.

Attractions
 Brimbank Central Shopping Centre
 Kororoit Creek
 Kororoit Creek Trail

Education

 Albanvale Primary School
 Brimbank College

Flora and fauna

The Kororoit Creek forms the 700m western border of the suburb. This area once had large healthy populations of native reptiles, including Tiger snake, Eastern Blue-tongued Lizard, Common snakeneck turtle and Eastern brown snake. Due to development these species are now rarely seen in the area.

Due to the recent development of the Cairnlea and Burnside estates, on the southern and eastern borders of Albanvale, native species of frogs have taken advantage and have taken up residence in the new wetlands and lakes. The Common Eastern Froglet and the now endangered Growling Grass Frog have been seen and heard in the new wetlands and around Kororoit Creek.

Sports facilities

Albanvale Football Club is an Australian Rules football team competing in the Western Region Football League.

See also
 City of Sunshine – Albanvale was previously within this former local government area.
 Kororoit Creek
 Kororoit Creek Trail

References

Suburbs of Melbourne
Suburbs of the City of Brimbank